Sanjida Akter Meghla (born 4 June 2001) is a Bangladeshi cricketer who plays as a slow left-arm orthodox bowler. In October 2019, she was named in Bangladesh's squad for their series against Bangladesh. She made her Women's Twenty20 International (WT20I) debut for Bangladesh, against Pakistan, on 30 October 2019.

In November 2021, she was named in Bangladesh's Women's One Day International (WODI) squad for their series against Zimbabwe, and for the 2021 Women's Cricket World Cup Qualifier tournament, also in Zimbabwe. In January 2022, she was named in Bangladesh's team for the 2022 Commonwealth Games Cricket Qualifier tournament in Malaysia. Later the same month, she was named as one of two reserve players in Bangladesh's team for the 2022 Women's Cricket World Cup in New Zealand.

References

External links
 
 

2001 births
Living people
People from Jessore District
Bangladeshi women cricketers
Bangladesh women Twenty20 International cricketers
Chittagong Division women cricketers